The Northern Rhodesian Labour Party was a political party in Northern Rhodesia.

History
The party was established by Roy Welensky in 1941. It was supported by European working class miners and artisans, and campaigned for closer union with Southern Rhodesia. The first congress of the party was held in Nkana on 11 July 1941, and called for immediate amalgamation with Southern Rhodesia.

In the 1941 general elections the party contested five of the eight seats, winning them all; Welensky in Broken Hill, F. T. Sinclair in Livingstone and Western, Michael McGann in Luanshya, F S Roberts in Ndola and Martin Visagie in Nkana. However, it was dissolved after it was defeated in the 1944 elections.

References

Defunct political parties in Zambia
1941 establishments in Northern Rhodesia
Political parties established in 1941
Political parties with year of disestablishment missing
Labour parties